Beit Jann is a Druze village on Mount Meron in northern Israel. At 940 meters above sea level, Beit Jann is one of the highest inhabited locations in the country.

Etymology 
Guérin noted that the village was known as Beitegene or Bette-Gen during the Middle Ages.

History
Beit Jann is an ancient village site at the top of a hill. Old stones have been reused in village homes, and cisterns and tombs carved into rock have also been found.

In the Crusader era it was known as Beitegen. In 1249, John Aleman transferred land, including the  casalia of  Beit Jann,  Sajur,  Majd al-Krum and Nahf to the Teutonic Knights.

According to local legend, Druze families in the area lived in scattered colonies in the hills near sources of water until the 13th or 14th century. Two hunters looking for hyraxes stumbled upon a cave where they found an ancient cistern filled with water. Concluding that this was a good place for permanent settlement, several families settled on the site of what would become Beit Jann.

Ottoman Empire
In 1517, the village was incorporated into the Ottoman Empire with the rest of Palestine, and in 1596, Bayt Jinn appeared in Ottoman tax registers as being in  nahiya (subdistrict) of Akka under the liwa' (district) of Safad. It had a population of 102 households and 5 bachelors, all Muslims. They paid taxes on silk spinning (dulab harir), occasional revenues, goats and/or beehives, olive oil press and/or a press for grape syrup.

In August 1754, the missionary Stephan Schulz visited the village. He noted that the inhabitants produced water-skins, and described the grapes of the region as particularly large and fine.

The American biblical scholar Edward Robinson described Beit Jann as a "large well-built village" in 1852, with houses made of limestone. There were 260 male residents, all Druze,  in the village. In 1875, the French explorer Victor Guérin visited the village, which he called Beit Djenn. He estimated it had two hundred people, all Druze. He further noted that "A few years ago it was much larger, as is indicated by the abandoned houses which are beginning to fall into ruins. I am told that
their occupants have fled to the Hauran to escape conscription.".. "The flanks of the hill on which the village stands are covered with vines which creep along the ground; their grapes [are] of a prodigious size.."  In 1881 the Palestine Exploration Fund's Survey of Western Palestine described Beit Jenn as a good village built of stone, with 300 Muslims and 100 Druze, with extensive gardens and vineyards.

A population list from about 1887 showed  Beit Jenn to have  about 1,215 inhabitants; all Druze.

British Mandate
In the 1922 census of Palestine conducted by the British Mandate authorities, Bait Jan had a population of 902: 6 Muslims, 1 Christian and 895 Druze;  the only Christian was an Anglican. At the time of the 1931 census, Beit Jann had 229 occupied houses and a population of 1100 Druze and 1 Muslim.

In the 1945 statistics the population of Beit Jann together with  Ein al-Asad was 1,640, all classified as "others" (i.e., Druze),   who owned 43,550 dunams of land according to an official land and population survey. 2,530 dunams were plantations and irrigable land, 7,406 used for cereals, while 67 dunams were built-up (urban) land.

Israel
In September 1991, the body of Samir Assad, an Israel Defense Forces soldier from Beit Jann, held since 1983 by the DFLP, was returned in exchange for the return to Israel of exiled members of the DFLP.

In July 2006, during the Second Lebanon War, Beit Jann was hit by Katyusha rockets fired by Hezbollah. In the aftermath of the 2021 Meron crowd crush, the village offered help to the survivors and offered emergency services if ever needed. Mayor Radi Najm said that several families had sheltered survivors of the disaster. Illegal logging in the vicinity of Beit Jann has led to conflicts with park officials and rangers.

Geography and climate
Beit Jann has a cool climate, even in summer, and offers panoramic views that stretch as far as the Sea of Galilee and the Mediterranean on a clear day. Several families in the village run bed and breakfast facilities. The village is located inside the Mount Meron nature reserve.

Education
In 2013, Beit Jann high school was ranked first in the country for the number of students graduating with a bagrut matriculation certificate.

The village had no playground until 2020, when one was built with the help of JNF UK.

See also
Arab localities in Israel
Druze in Israel

References

Bibliography

External links
Palestine Remembered Bayt Jann
Survey of Western Palestine, Map 4:   IAA, Wikimedia commons

Arab localities in Israel
Druze communities in Israel
Local councils in Northern District (Israel)